The Progressive Liberal Party was a political party in Saint Kitts and Nevis. The party contested the 1989 general elections, but received just 12 votes and failed to win a seat. They did not contest any further elections.

References

Political parties in Saint Kitts and Nevis
1980s in Saint Kitts and Nevis